Kalanchoe tomentosa, also known as pussy ears or panda plant, is a succulent plant in the genus Kalanchoe.  A native of Madagascar, Kalanchoe tomentosa has many different cultivars such as 'Golden Girl', 'Chocolate Soldier', 'Black Tie' and 'Teddy Bear'. It has red-rimmed leaves.

It has received the Royal Horticultural Society's Award of Garden Merit.

See also
List of kalanchoe diseases

References

External links

tomentosa
Garden plants
Endemic flora of Madagascar
Plants described in 1882
Taxa named by John Gilbert Baker